"A Sound of Thunder" is a science fiction short story by American writer Ray Bradbury, first published in Collier's magazine in the June 28, 1952, issue and later in Bradbury's collection The Golden Apples of the Sun in 1953.

Plot summary
In the year 2055, time travel has become a practical reality, and the company Time Safari Inc. offers wealthy adventurers the chance to travel back in time to hunt extinct species such as dinosaurs. A hunter named Eckels pays $10,000 to join a hunting party that will travel back 66 million years to the Late Cretaceous period, on a guided safari to kill a Tyrannosaurus rex. As the party waits to depart, they discuss the recent presidential elections in which an apparently fascist candidate, Deutscher, has been defeated by his opponent Keith, to the relief of many concerned. When the party arrives in the past, Travis (the hunting guide) and Lesperance (Travis's assistant) warn Eckels and the two other hunters, Billings and Kramer, about the necessity of minimizing the events they change before they go back, since even the smallest alterations to the distant past could snowball into catastrophic changes in history. Travis explains that the hunters are obliged to stay on a levitating path to avoid disrupting the environment, that any deviation will be punished with hefty fines, and that prior to the hunt, Time Safari scouts had been sent back to select and tag prey whose death has been calculated to have minimal effect on the future.

Although Eckels is initially excited about the hunt, when the monstrous Tyrannosaurus approaches, he loses his nerve. Travis tells him to go back to the time machine, but Eckels panics, steps off the path, and stumbles into the forest. Eckels hears shots, and on his return, he sees that the two guides have killed the dinosaur, and shortly afterward the falling tree that would have killed the T. rex has landed on top of it. Realizing that Eckels has fallen off the path, Travis threatens to leave him in the past unless he removes the bullets from the dinosaur's body, as they cannot be left behind. Eckels obeys, but Travis remains furious, threatening on the return trip to shoot him.

Upon returning to 2055, Eckels notices subtle changes: English words are now spelled and spoken strangely, people behave differently, and Eckels discovers that Deutscher has won the election instead of Keith. Looking at the mud on his boots, Eckels finds a crushed butterfly, whose death has apparently caused a rift in the timeline that has affected the nature of the alternative present to which the safari has returned. He frantically pleads with Travis to take him back into the past to undo the damage, but Travis had previously explained that the time machine cannot return to any point in time that it has already visited (so as to prevent any paradoxes). Travis raises his gun, and there is "a sound of thunder".

Adaptations
A comic-book version appeared in issue #25 of EC Comics's Weird Science-Fantasy (1954), adapted by Al Feldstein with art by Al Williamson and Angelo Torres.

The story was adapted for the first issue of Topp's Publishing's Ray Bradbury Comics (1993) with art by Richard Corben.

The story was adapted for the fourth season episode six of The Ray Bradbury Theater on October 8, 1989, starring Kiel Martin.

A film adaptation of the same name starring Ben Kingsley, Edward Burns, and Catherine McCormack was released in 2005. Famed film critic Roger Ebert stated that while he "cannot endorse it, [he] can appreciate it" as a film that is bad because it "want[s] so much to be terrific that [it] explode[s] under the strain".

A Game Boy Advance video game based on the film was also released. It was finished in time for the film's planned 2003 release, delayed along with it, and ultimately released in February 2005. Planned console ports were canceled.

The story is parodied in the Time and Punishment section of The Simpsons episode "Treehouse of Horror V".

Influence
"A Sound of Thunder" is often credited as the origin of the term "butterfly effect", a concept of chaos theory in which the flapping of a butterfly's wings in one part of the world could create a hurricane on the opposite side of the globe. The term was actually introduced by meteorologist Edward Norton Lorenz in the 1960s. However, Bradbury's concept of how the death of a butterfly in the past could have drastic changes in the future is a representation of the butterfly effect and is used as an example of how to consider chaos theory and the physics of time travel.

References

Further reading

External links

 
 

1952 short stories
Fiction set in 2055
Living dinosaurs in fiction
Science fiction short stories
Short fiction about time travel
Short stories adapted into films
Short stories by Ray Bradbury
Works originally published in Collier's